Thomas M. Wagner (c. 1824 – July 17, 1862) was a lieutenant colonel in the Confederate Army during the American Civil War. He was killed when a cannon exploded during an inspection at Fort Moultrie.  The main fortification on Morris Island was subsequently named for him and was the site of the First and Second Battle of Fort Wagner.

Before the war, he was a South Carolina state senator and an executive of the Charleston and Savannah Railroad.

1820s births
1862 deaths
Confederate States Army officers
Confederate States of America military personnel killed in the American Civil War
South Carolina state senators
American railroad executives
19th-century American politicians
Burials at St. Michael's Churchyard (Charleston)
19th-century American businesspeople